

Background 
Founded in Los Angeles in 1968 by veteran labor, immigrant rights, and community organizers, the Centro de Acción Social Autónomo-Hermandad General de Trabajadores (Center for Autonomous Social Action--General Brotherhood of Workers, abbreviated as CASA-HGT or more commonly CASA) was a hub of organizing, training, and mutual aid focused on immigrant and Chicano workers. CASA began as a chapter of a San Diego organization, established in 1950 called a Hermadad Mexicana Nacional. La Hermadad's main focus was on supporting immigrant workers organize themselves since at the time unions refused to work with undocumented communities.  During the early 1970s, organizers established CASA chapters in San Diego and San Jose, California, El Paso, Texas, Greeley, Colorado, and Chicago, Illinois. Working with progressive lawyers and trade unions, CASA developed strategies that became common in the immigrant rights movement.

History
Veteran labor and community organizers Bert Corona, Humberto Camacho (United Electrical, Radio and Machine Workers of America), Rose Chernin (Committee to Protect the Foreign Born), conceived of CASA way to promote self-organization and mutual aid among undocumented immigrants. 

By the late 1960s, U.S. employers were recruiting large numbers of Mexican immigrants for jobs in urban industries, just as changes in immigration policy drastically reduced the number authorized migrants from Mexico. CASA worked with progressive activists and lawyers to promote "know your rights" campaigns in immigrant communities, supported unionization drives among immigrant workers, and challenged the legality of neighborhood and workplace raids by the Immigration and Naturalization Service. It also served as a training ground for young militants committed to worker organizing and as cross-border solidarity. The national network of CASAs supported the National Coalition for Fair Immigration Laws and Practices that challenged the immigration policies of the Carter and Reagan administrations.

Initially based in East Los Angeles, CASA moved to rented offices in the Pico-Union neighborhood in 1970 that included an in house law firm, a meeting hall, and a kitchen. Corona served as the leader, joined by labor organizer Soledad "Chole" Alatorre in 1972. At its height, the organization claimed 8,000 dues paying members in Los Angeles. Corona and Alatorre left the organization in 1974 when a younger group of leaders took charge.

References

1968 establishments in California
Mexican-American history
Labor movement in the United States
Defunct organizations based in California
Immigrant rights organizations